Fairport may refer to:

 Fairport, California
 Fairport, Iowa
 Fairport, Michigan
 Fairport, Missouri
 Fairport, New York
 Fairport, North Carolina
 Fairport, Virginia
 Fairport Harbor, Ohio
 Dresden, Ontario, formerly named 'Fairport', a town in Ontario, Canada
 Fairport Convention, the British folk rock band